If Not Now Then When? is the debut solo studio album by English artist and record producer Ethan Johns. Inspired by the 22 minute opus of the same name by early 1990s Dublin band Spacepony UK (members of which later formed Future Kings Of Spain), it was released in November 2012 on vinyl and was scheduled to be released in other formats in February 2013, by his own Three Crows Music label. The album was recorded in early 2012 and was engineered by Dominic Monks. If Not Now Then When? was mixed by Johns' father, audio engineer and record producer Glyn Johns, at Sunset Sound in Los Angeles. The album features performances with Ryan Adams, Laura Marling and Danny Thompson. Bill Wyman played bass guitar on "Red Rooster Blue." Johns will follow the vinyl release of the album with a full UK tour of independent record stores in November 2012.

Track listing
All tracks composed by Ethan Johns

Personnel
Ethan Johns - vocals, acoustic and electric guitar, Mellotron, Wurlitzer electric piano, Chamberlin, percussion, harmonica, sound effects, programming
Jeremy Stacey - drums
Bill Wyman - bass on "Red Rooster Blue"
Ian McLagan - organ on "Red Rooster Blue"
Richard Causon - piano and SK1 organ on "The Turning", keyboards on "The Long Way Round"
Danny Thompson - bass on "Rally", "Whip Poor Will" and "The Long Way Round"
Dave Swarbrick - fiddle on "Rally"
Ryan Adams - bass and drums on "Don't Reach Too Far", backing vocals on "Whip Poor Will"
Chris Holland - organ on "Don't Reach Too Far"
Melvin Duffy - pedal steel guitar on "Whip Poor Will"
Laura Marling - backing vocals on "Whip Poor Will"

References

2012 debut albums